Sungei Kadut is an industrial estate and planning area located in the North Region of Singapore. It is bounded by Bukit Panjang and Choa Chu Kang to the south, Mandai to the east, as well as Lim Chu Kang and the Western Water Catchment to the west. Its northern boundary is defined by the Straits of Johor.

Etymology and history
In the Malay language, Sungei refers to river and Kadut refers to sack cloth. In the 1900s, around Sungei Kadut is a mangrove swamp that stretches to the now Kranji Reservoir. During World War II, Sungei Kadut was one of the first sites where the Japanese soldiers entered Singapore. It was later developed into an industrial site.

In the 1970s and 1980s, furniture making and milling factories sprung across the estate. These clusters of factories housing perishable combustibles subsequently become a source of fire hazard in the region that a fire post is set up in the region. Several years ago, blazing fires have even caused MRT trains along North South MRT line to stop operation. On August 3, 2008, the worst blaze occurred in a factory. Initial attempts to control the blaze failed as it spread to several stacks of wooden pellets and tires nearby. It required more than 4 hours and 100 firemen before the fire was being put out. As several factories were not insured, many companies suffered huge losses.

Transportation
Currently, Kranji MRT station on the North South line is the only station serving the vicinity. Sungei Kadut MRT station between Kranji and Yew Tee stations in the industrial estate is planned to open in the mid-2030s, as indicated in the Land Transport Master Plan (LTMP) 2040 by the Land Transport Authority.

Currently, SMRT Bus Service 925 serves the Sungei Kadut Industrial Estate, which operates from Woodlands to Choa Chu Kang Bus Interchange daily except for Sundays and public holidays. Other services that passes by Woodlands Road include 160, 170, 170A, 178, 927, 960, 961 & 961M.

References

 
Places in Singapore
North Region, Singapore
 
Western Water Catchment